Whodunnit? is a play written by Anthony Shaffer in 1977, originally called The Case of the Oily Levantine.

Plot summary
Whodunnit? is a comedy / mystery play.  The first act follows the traditional conventions of a country house mystery with an assortment of suspects, but in the second act it becomes apparent that nobody is truly what they seem.

Act 1
A collection of characters apparently drawn directly from old English detective fiction arrive for a party in an old country house.  Among them there is an old Navy man, a ditzy woman, and a flamboyantly eccentric butler who keeps trying to serve up his own cocktail creation, the "Zombie Whammy".  There is also Andreas Capodistriou, a smooth talking serpent of a man who demonstrates to each guest in turn that he knows something compromising about them and is intent on blackmailing each one.

The act climaxes as each guest, having a reason to want Capodistriou dead, conceals his or her self on the set to lie in wait for the victim, who arrives alone and kneels to perform his evening prayer.  As he does so, a collection of sword-wielding hands appear around him.  One blade falls, removing his head, and the curtain falls.

Act 2
The act opens on an incongruous scene.  Policemen in modern dress mingle with the archaically dressed guests.  They are investigating the murder that ended the first act.  The old Navy man sneezes and loses his fake mustache in the process.  He reveals that he is actually an actor, and was hired to participate in a role-playing party for the house's owner, who would act as detective and solve the mystery.  It transpires that all of the "guests", and the butler, are also hired actors.  The entire affair has been orchestrated in order to murder the man who played "Capodistriou".  This in turn is revealed to be Gerry Marshall, a theatrical agent who held the contracts of all the actors except the one playing the host, with whom he had a different relationship.  Each actor hated Marshall, but all deny knowing it was him playing Capodistriou.  The organizer of the party was apparently Marshall himself.  It is up to Inspector Bowden to unravel the tangle of relationships, real and unreal, to unmask the killer.

Cast of characters
Cast of characters.

Dame Edith Runcible, an eccentric archaeologist
Lady Tremurrain, a dotty aristocrat
Archibald Perkins, the butler
Silas Bazeby, a respectable family lawyer
Rear-Admiral Knatchbull Folliatt, an old sea dog
Roger Dashwell, a black sheep
Inspector Bowden, an unconventional Scotland Yard detective
Andreas Capodistriou, an oily Levantine
sergeant, a stolid copper
Lavinia Hargreaves, a sweet young thing

West End production
An earlier version of the play, under the title The Case of the Oily Levantine, opened at Her Majesty's Theatre on 13 September 1979. The designer was Hayden Griffin and the director was Patrick Dromgoole, with costumes by Anne Sinclair and lighting by Howard Eaton. The cast was as follows:

Andreas Capodistriou - Hywel Bennett
Archibald Perkins - Wolfe Morris
Dame Edith Runcible - Gwen Nelson
Lady Tremurrain - Anna Quayle
Lavinia Hargreaves - Adrienne Posta
Rear Admiral Knatchbull Folliatt - William Squire
Roger Dashwell - Paul Angelis
Sergeant - Roger Leach
Silas Bazeby - Bernard Archard

Broadway production
The Broadway production of Whodunnit? began previews at the Biltmore Theatre on 14 December 1982.  After 19 previews, it opened on 30 December 1982.  It closed on 15 May 1983 after 157 performances.

The production credits for opening night were as follows:
Michael Kahn – director
Patricia Zipprodt – costume designer
Andrew Jackness – scenic designer
Martin Acronstein – lighting designer
Richard Fitzgerald – sound designer
Patrik D. Moreton – hair and make-up designer
Douglas Urbanski, Robert A. Buckley and E. Gregg Wallace, Jr. – producers

The opening night cast was as follows:
Dame Edith Runcible – Hermione Baddeley
Lady Tremurrain – Barbara Baxley
Archibald Perkins – Gordon Chater
Silas Bazeby – Jerome Dempsey
Rear-Admiral Knatchbull Folliatt – Ronald Drake
Roger Dashwell – John Glover
Inspector Bowden – Fred Gwynne
Andreas Capodistriou – George Hearn
sergeant – Jeffrey Alan Chandler
Lavinia Hargreaves – Lauren Thompson

References

External links
Whodunnit? on Anthony Shaffer's website.

1977 plays